Kaw Valley FC is an American soccer club competing in the USL League Two in the Heartland Division of the Central Conference.  The team trains at the Swope Soccer Village in Kansas City and plays their home matches in both Topeka and Lawrence, Kansas.

On June 8, 2021, KVFC announced they will be fielding a women's side to compete in the new USL W League beginning in 2022.

Year-by-year

References

USL League Two teams
Association football clubs established in 2017
2017 establishments in Kansas
Soccer clubs in Kansas
Lawrence, Kansas
Sports in Topeka, Kansas
Sporting Kansas City